"Give Me Wings" is a song written by Kye Fleming and Don Schlitz, and recorded by American country pop artist Michael Johnson.  It was released in September 1986 as the second single from the album Wings.  The song was Johnson's third country hit and was the first of two number one country singles.  The single went to number one for one week and spent a total of sixteen weeks on the country chart.

Charts

Weekly charts

Year-end charts

References

1986 singles
1986 songs
Michael Johnson (singer) songs
Billboard Hot Country Songs number-one singles of the year
Songs written by Kye Fleming
Songs written by Don Schlitz
RCA Records singles
Song recordings produced by Brent Maher